Allium lamondiae is a plant species found in Pakistan, Afghanistan and Iran. It is a perennial herb up to 25 cm tall, with tubular leaves, producing a hemispherical umbel of flowers. Tepals white with reddish-brown midveins.

References

lamondiae
Onions
Flora of Iran
Flora of Afghanistan
Flora of Pakistan
Plants described in 1967